Sadik Mujkič (born 29 February 1968) is a retired Slovenian rower and Olympic medallist at the 1988 and the 1992 Summer Olympics.

References 

1968 births
Living people
Yugoslav male rowers
Slovenian male rowers
Olympic rowers of Slovenia
Olympic rowers of Yugoslavia
Rowers at the 1988 Summer Olympics
Rowers at the 1992 Summer Olympics
Rowers at the 1996 Summer Olympics
Olympic bronze medalists for Slovenia
Olympic bronze medalists for Yugoslavia
Olympic medalists in rowing
Medalists at the 1992 Summer Olympics
Medalists at the 1988 Summer Olympics